Captain Frederick Wentworth is a fictional character in the 1817 novel Persuasion written by Jane Austen. He is the prototype of the new gentleman in the 19th century: a self-made man who makes his fortune by hard work rather than inheritance.

Character
Over eight years before the novel opens, Frederick Wentworth travelled to Somerset after being made commander in consequence of the British naval action off St Domingo (1806). He was not immediately sent back to sea, but went to stay with his brother, Reverend Edward Wentworth, ashore as the curate of Monkford. Frederick and Anne fell in love and got engaged. Later, Anne broke off the engagement on the advice of her godmother, Lady Russell, who saw him as an unsuitable choice due to his lack of fortune and connections, as well as his enrollment in a dangerous profession. Further, Anne was young and might have more choices in her future. Disappointed and resentful, Wentworth left the area.

Captain Wentworth returns from the Napoleonic Wars in 1814, successful, and with prize money of 25,000 pounds to his credit. Anne's conditions have also changed as her father, a spendthrift baronet, has to lease his country house, Kellynch Hall, to Admiral and Mrs Croft, and move to Bath to lower his expenses. Anne currently is visiting her married younger sister, Mary Musgrove, at Uppercross. Mrs Croft is sister to Frederick Wentworth, and he visits her once she and her husband are settled.

Captain Wentworth has not forgiven Anne. Without much thought, he is sociable and most gentlemanly with both Musgrove sisters, Henrietta and Louisa, sisters to Mary's husband Charles, seeing Anne often as part of the Uppercross social circle. Henrietta re-connects with her fiancé, Charles Hayter. Wentworth talks about a firm mind, influencing Louisa to be more demanding than usual. When others talk to him as if his engagement to Louisa is all but announced, he realizes from honour that he must marry her if she so wishes.

Captain Wentworth is aware of Anne, and listens to what others say about her. He learns that she turned down an offer of marriage from Charles Musgrove about five years earlier, which startles him. Anne guards her emotions for each encounter with Frederick in the group of friends at Uppercross. A trip to Lyme with the Musgrove family to meet Captains Harville and Benwick changes everything. There Louisa meets with a serious accident; Anne's immediate help and level-headed behaviour makes Wentworth realize his folly of letting appearances get ahead of his intentional choices. Once Louisa is settled for her long recovery with the Harvilles, Wentworth goes off for a long visit with his now-married brother, Edward, in Shropshire.

He begins to realise that by indulging his injured-pride, hurt by the rejection by Anne, he may be blocking his best chance at happiness, and his love for Anne is allowed to surface again. Benwick residing with the Harville family, having been engaged to Harville's sister who died before they could marry, stays while Louisa slowly recovers.

When Louisa is recovered, the news spreads that Captain Benwick is engaged to her. Safe and independent again, Frederick Wentworth goes to Bath to win Anne back, only to spy a competitor in her cousin, Mr. William Elliot, the inheritor of Kellynch Hall. They meet at a few gatherings, with brief moments to speak with each other. At a gathering of the Musgroves in a Bath hotel, he overhears Captain Harville and Anne talk about the relative faithfulness of men and women. Deeply-moved by Anne's words, he writes her a letter and makes sure she sees it. They reconcile and renew their love and engagement. He learns in those discussions that when he had come ashore in 1808 ("the year eight"), after winning his step to captain and with his first prize money, had he written to her, would she have replied? Yes, she would have replied and felt safe-enough to renew the engagement against the wishes of her family. He realises how he has been his own enemy in this. In the end they marry and live a happy life. Nothing remains to blight their happiness other than a future war, when the Navy might call him back to a ship.

Literary significance
Captain Frederick Wentworth is the prototype of the 'new gentleman.' Maintaining the good manners, consideration, and sensitivity of the older type,  Wentworth adds the qualities of gallantry, independence, and bravery that come with being a well-respected Naval officer. He has made his own fortune through hard work and good sense, in direct contrast to Sir Walter who has only wasted the money that came to him through his title. Without land or high birth, Captain Wentworth is not the traditional match for a woman of Anne Elliot's position. But in true Austenian fashion, his fine personal qualities are enough to surmount the divide which separates his social position from that of Anne.

In the novel, Captain Wentworth's character develops, eventually overcoming his resentment at being once refused, in order to make another ardent overture to his chosen bride. This development is sign of a promising future for their relationship. Like Admiral Croft, who allows his wife to drive the carriage alongside him and to help him steer, Captain Wentworth will defer to Anne throughout their marriage. Austen envisions this kind of equal partnership as the ideal marriage, within the limits of 18th century social customs.

Margaret Wilson sees Wentworth as combining the dynamic character of Austen's earlier diversionary men and the steadfast qualities needed in a husband.

The love letter written by Captain Wentworth is notable:

The letter comes near the end of the novel, leading Anne and Frederick to renew their love.

Depictions in film and television
 1960: Paul Daneman, BBC series Persuasion (1960 series)
 1971: Bryan Marshall, BBC series Persuasion (1971 series)
 1995: Ciarán Hinds, made-for-television Persuasion (1995 film)
 2007: Rupert Penry-Jones, ITV1 Persuasion (2007 film)
 2022: Cosmo Jarvis, Netflix film Persuasion (2022 film)

References

Persuasion characters
Literary characters introduced in 1818
Fictional military captains
Male characters in literature